The 1919 Cardiff City Council election was held on Saturday 1 November 1919 to elect councillors to Cardiff City Council in Cardiff, Glamorgan, Wales.

This was the first all-Cardiff elections for six years, due to the occurrence of 1914-18 Great War. The previous elections were in November 1913 and the next annual all-Cardiff elections were to take place as normal on 1 November 1920.

The election saw control of the council transfer from the Conservative Party to the Liberals.

Background
Cardiff County Borough Council had been created in 1889. Cardiff became a city in 1905. Elections to the local authority were held annually, though not all council seats were included in each contest, because the three councillors in each ward stood down for election in three-yearly rotation.

The council consisted of 30 councillors who were elected by the town's voters and ten aldermen who were elected by the councillors. Ten seats were up for election in November 1919.

Overview of the result

Contests took place in all ten of the Cardiff electoral wards in November 1919. In addition to candidates standing under the Conservative, Liberal and Labour tickets, there were men standing from discharged soldiers' organisations, as Ex-Service men candidates. Press interest was also raised by a 'lady candidate' in the Roath ward, who was standing for the Women's Council. Mrs Janet Price Williams was unsuccessful in her bid to be Cardiff's first woman councillor.

The election news was dominated by the successes of the Labour and Ex-Servicemen candidates in South Wales. Four Labour and three Ex-Servicemen won seats in Cardiff.

Council composition
The composition of the council immediately prior to these elections as Conservatives 20, Liberals 19, Independent 1. Following the November 1919 election the balance had changed, to 17 Liberal, 15 Conservative, 4 Labour, 3 Ex-Servicemen, 1 Independent.

Ward results

Adamsdown

Canton

Cathays

Central

Grangetown

Park

Riverside

Roath

South

Splott

* = 'retiring' ward councillor for re-election

References

1910s in Cardiff
Cardiff
Council elections in Cardiff